The 2014 Argentine Republic motorcycle Grand Prix was the third round of the 2014 MotoGP season. It was held at the Autódromo Termas de Río Hondo in Santiago del Estero on 27 April 2014.

Classification

MotoGP

Moto2

Moto3

Championship standings after the race (MotoGP)
Below are the standings for the top five riders and constructors after round three has concluded.

Riders' Championship standings

Constructors' Championship standings

 Note: Only the top five positions are included for both sets of standings.

References

Argentine Republic motorcycle Grand Prix
Argentine
Motorcycle Grand Prix
Argentine Republic motorcycle Grand Prix